Sana Krasikov (born Ukraine) is a writer living in the United States. She grew up in the Republic of Georgia, as well as the United States. She graduated from Cornell University in 2001 where she lived at the Telluride House, and from the Iowa Writers' Workshop. In 2017 she was named one of Granta's Best Young American Novelists. In 2019 The Patriots won France's Prix Du Premiere Roman Etranger prize for best first novel in translation.

Career
Krasikov is the author of the novel The Patriots, which explores the tangled relationship between Russia and America through the perspectives of one American family moving back and forth between continents over three generations. The novel's main character, Florence Fein, makes a reverse immigration from Brooklyn to Moscow during the Great Depression. 
The story also touches on Russia's state-supported oil and gas industry. The Spectator has written, "as an intelligent literary commentary on Russo-American relations of the past century, it's unparalleled."  The Patriots has been praised as 'timely', 'current' and 'urgently relevant' by The New York Times, Tablet, The Guardian, and other publications.

Krasikov's debut short story collection, One More Year, released in 2008, first drew critical acclaim for its exploration of the lives of Russian and Georgian immigrants who had settled in the United States. It received favorable reviews from The San Francisco Chronicle, The Boston Globe, Oprah Magazine, Entertainment Weekly, The New York Times, and The New York Sun. It was later named a finalist for the 2009 PEN/Hemingway Award and The New York Public Library's Young Lions Fiction Award, received a National Book Foundation's "5 under 35" Award, and won the 2009 Sami Rohr Prize for Jewish Literature. In her stories, which appeared first in The New Yorker, The Atlantic, Zoetrope and other magazines, one catches a glimpse of the new twenty-first century moment that followed the collapse of the Soviet Union. The short story 'Companion, won an O.Henry Award, and was longlisted for the Best American Short Stories, as were two other stories in the collection. The story Asal, which appeared in The Virginia Quarterly, garnered a National Magazine Award nomination.  'One More Year'  has gone on to be translated into eleven languages.

Personal life
Krasikov has been married to radio journalist Gregory Warner since 2009. In 2016 Warner and Krasikov conceived and developed a narrative podcast called Rough Translation. The show which takes topics familiar to Americans—fake news, affirmative action, dating, surrogacy—and examines them through a new cultural lens.  Rough Translation is currently hosted by Gregory Warner for NPR. Krasikov continues to assist in story-shaping and editing of episodes.

Awards
 National Book Foundation's "5 Under 35" (2008) 
 New York Public Library Young Lions Finalist (2009)
 Finalist for 2009 Hemingway Foundation/PEN Award for a distinguished first book of fiction 
 2009 Sami Rohr Prize for Jewish Fiction
 O. Henry Award 
 2009 National Magazine Award Nomination (for Virginia Quarterly Review)
 Granta's Best Young American Novelists 2017
 Prix du Premier Roman Etranger 2019, France, for best first novel in foreign language

Works
One more year  London : Portobello, 2010. , 
The Patriots Random House Inc 2017. ,

References

External links 
 Official Website: sanakrasikov.com
 Interview with Sana Krasikov, The Short Review
 Pen America World Voices Festival
 New Yorker Festival
 Unorthodox Podcast
 The Book Review Podcast
 SF Gate: One More Year

Year of birth missing (living people)
Living people
Soviet emigrants to the United States
Iowa Writers' Workshop alumni
21st-century Ukrainian women writers